Hoseynabad-e Alam Khan (also Romanized as Ḩoseynābād-e ‘Alam Khān; also known as Hosein Abad and Ḩoseynābād) is a village in Fahraj Rural District, in the Central District of Fahraj County, Kerman Province, Iran. At the 2006 census, its population was 1,046, in 240 families.

References 

Populated places in Fahraj County